Máximo González is the defending champion, but lost in the quarterfinals this year.
Guido Pella won the title, defeating Leonardo Kirche 6–4, 6–0 this year.

Seeds

Draw

Finals

Top half

Bottom half

References
 Main Draw
 Qualifying Draw

Tetra Pak Tennis Cup - Singles
2012 Singles